The terms Malayali Brahmins (also known as Malayala Brahmanar) and Kerala Brahmins apply to the group of Brahmins from the Indian state of Kerala. These groups include the Nambudiri, Pushpaka Unni, Nambeesan, Nambidi, Moothath (Moosad), Ilayath, Chakyar,  Nambiar,  and the Potti. The Pidarar community are Brahmins that follow Kaula sampradaya.

References

Malayali Brahmins
Brahmin communities across India